Dawyck House is a historic house at Dawyck, in the parish of Drumelzier in the former Peeblesshire, in the Scottish Borders area of Scotland. The alternative name is 'Dalwick House'. Canmore ID 49816.

Dawyck Castle was built about the Thirteenth century and belonged to the Veitch family until the mid Sixteenth century when the estate and barony passed to the Balfours.  Dawyck was demolished in 1830 and the Dawyck House mansion was erected on the same footprint. The current house has been protected as a Category B listed building since 23 February 1971 and the grounds were added to the Inventory of Gardens and Designed Landscapes in Scotland in 1987.

Dawyck (together with Stobo Castle) were the first Scottish sites to introduce the non-native species of horse chestnut in 1650.

The grounds of the house are now operated as Dawyck Botanic Garden, a "regional garden" of the Royal Botanic Garden Edinburgh. Dawyck Chapel is in the grounds of the botanic garden.

See also

List of places in the Scottish Borders
List of places in Scotland

References

External links
RCAHMS record for Dawyck House
RCAHMS record for Dalwick House, Policies
RCAHMS record for Dalwick House, Kitchen Garden
RCAHMS record for Dalwick House, Formal Garden
RCAHMS record for Dalwick House North Lodge and Gateway
SCRAN image: Dawyck House Stobo Peeblesshire
Streetmap, Dawyck House
Flickr image of Dawyck House
British Listed Buildings: Dawyck House, Drumelzier
Dictionary of Scottish Architects: William Burn, 1789-1870
Virtual Tenby

Houses in the Scottish Borders
Category B listed buildings in the Scottish Borders
Inventory of Gardens and Designed Landscapes